Saint George is an American television sitcom created by George Lopez, David McFadzean, and Matt Williams, which originally aired on FX from March 6, 2014, to May 8, 2014. It is Lopez's first starring role in a scripted series since his ABC show George Lopez.

As part of Debmar-Mercury and Lionsgate Television's syndication model, if the series hit certain ratings thresholds in its first 10-episode run, that would have triggered an additional 90-episode order. The program fell short of those thresholds and Saint George was canceled on June 25, 2014, after one season.

Plot
Saint George revolves around the hectic life of a recently divorced working class Mexican-American who has become a successful entrepreneur. Lopez portrays the main character who must balance his family life—consisting of a demanding ex-wife, an 11-year-old son, and his mother, uncle, and cousin—and teaching history class at a night school once a week.

Cast and characters

Main cast
 George Lopez as George Lopez
 Jenn Lyon as Mackenzie Bradford-Lopez
 Olga Merediz as Alma Lopez
 Kaden Gibson as Harper Antonio Bradford-Lopez
 David Zayas as Junior
 Danny Trejo as Tio Danny

Recurring cast
 Diana-Maria Riva as Concepcion
 Joey Pollari as Tanner Whitman
 Tobit Raphael as Walden Penfield

Episodes

Reception
Saint George has been panned by critics. Reviews on the site Rotten Tomatoes were very scathing, with the show holding a 0% rating and average score of 3.6/10. The consensus reads: "You'd need the patience of a saint to sit through an episode of Saint George, a tired sitcom with bad potty-humor jokes and thin characters." Reception on Metacritic was somewhat better, but still negative, having a score of 31 out of 100, based on 14 critics, indicating "generally unfavorable reviews".

See also
 List of sitcoms notable for negative reception

References

External links 

 
 

2010s American sitcoms
2014 American television series debuts
2014 American television series endings
English-language television shows
FX Networks original programming
Television series by Lionsgate Television
Television shows set in Los Angeles
Latino sitcoms